Priyank Tehlan (born 11 September 1988) is an Indian first-class cricketer who plays for Haryana.

References

External links
 

1988 births
Living people
Indian cricketers
Haryana cricketers
Cricketers from Delhi